Hedong Township is a township of Yuexi County in southern Sichuan province, China, located adjacent to and northeast of the county seat. , it has eight villages under its administration.

References 

Township-level divisions of Sichuan
Yuexi County, Sichuan